Brad Peters (born 2 December 1962) is a Canadian gymnast. He competed at the 1984 Summer Olympics and the 1988 Summer Olympics.

His daughter is a singer under the name Rain Paris.

References

External links
 

1962 births
Living people
Canadian male artistic gymnasts
Olympic gymnasts of Canada
Gymnasts at the 1984 Summer Olympics
Gymnasts at the 1988 Summer Olympics
Sportspeople from Hamilton, Ontario